The 1992 United States presidential election in Idaho took place on November 3, 1992, as part of the 1992 United States presidential election. State voters chose four representatives, or electors to the Electoral College, who voted for president and vice president.

Idaho was won by incumbent President George H. W. Bush (R-Texas) with 42.03% of the popular vote over Governor Bill Clinton (D-Arkansas) with 28.42%. Businessman Ross Perot (I-Texas) finished in a close third, with 27.05% of the popular vote. Clinton ultimately won the national vote, defeating both incumbent President Bush and Perot. , this is the last election in which Bonner County, Clearwater County, Lewis County, and Benewah County, Idaho gave a plurality to a Democratic presidential candidate.

With 27.05 percent of the popular vote, Idaho would prove to be Perot's fourth strongest state after Maine, Alaska and Utah. This election is the second of only two elections since Idaho's statehood in which it did not vote the same as neighboring Montana, the other being its first election 100 years prior.

Results

Results by county

See also
 United States presidential elections in Idaho
 Presidency of Bill Clinton

Notes

References

Idaho
1992
1992 Idaho elections